Al-Wehdat Sport Club is a Jordanian sport club founded in 1956. The club is based in and represents the Amman New Camp, a Palestinian refugee camp which is also known as Al-Wehdat. Al-Wehdat's home games are played at King Abdullah II Stadium (cap. 13,265). There are other sports offered in the club, such as volleyball, basketball and table tennis.

History
The club was founded in 1956 under the name Al-Wehdat Youth Center. In 1974, they changed their name to Al-Wehdat Sport Club and have been called that since then (with the exception of 1986–1989 when it was named Al-Diffatain Sport Club.)

Al-Wehdat has 52 local trophies from 1980 and appears in 11 AFC Cup but did not achieve the title. Al-Wehdat won the second division in 1975 and were promoted to the first division for the first time ever, but were relegated in their first season. The next season, the club was promoted again. In the 15 years from 2005 to 2020 Al-Wehdat won the league 10 times  . Since 2005, Al-Faisaly won the league 4 times which made Al-Wehdat the dominant team in Jordanian football in the last 15 years, Al-Wehdat is the only Jordanian team that has won the four Jordanian competitions (Jordan League , FA Cup , Super Cup , FA Shield ) in a single season in the 2008–09, 2010–11 seasons. Al Wehdat is the first  Jordanian team to play in the AFC Champions League (group stage) .

Colours
The traditional and primary colors of Al-Wehdat are green and red. The kit has varied over the years. Currently the away kit is a full white. The home kit is a green top with white socks and red shorts.

Al Quwaysimah riot
After a 1–0 win in the Derby of Jordan versus Al-Faisaly on 10 December 2010, rioting broke out following the game between rival Amman clubs. Some Al-Faisaly fans threw bottles at Al-Wehdat players and their fans. About 250 people were injured. 243 of them Al-Wehdat fans, according to senior officials from the hospitals.

Honours
Source:

 shared record

Performance in AFC and UAFA competitions
 Asian Club Championship / AFC Champions League: 9 Appearances
1989–90: Qualifying stage
1995: First round
2002–03: Preliminary round 2
2015: Preliminary round 2
2016: Play-off round
2017: Play-off round
2019: Preliminary round 1
2021: Group stage
2022: Group stage
AFC Cup: 11 Appearances
2006: Semi-finals
2007: Semi-finals
2008: Group stage
2009: Group stage
2010: Group stage
2011: Semi-finals
2012: Quarter-finals
2015: Round of 16
2016: Round of 16
2017: Zonal semi-finals
2019: Zonal semi-finals

AFC Cup Winners Cup: 2 Appearances
2000–01: Quarter-finals
2001–02: Second round

Arab Club Champions Cup / Arab Champions League: 10 Appearances
1988: Preliminary round
1995: Group stage
1996: Group stage
1997: Group stage
1998: Group stage
1999: Group stage
2003–04: 	Second round
2005–06: Semi-finals
2007–08: Round of 16
2008–09: Quarter-finals
Arab Cup Winners' Cup :4 Appearances
1996: Group stage
1997: Group stage
1998: Preliminary round
2000: Group stage

IFFHS rankings

Club world ranking
Footballdatabase club's points 6 February 2022.

AFC club rankings
Footballdatabase club's points 6 February 2022.

National club rankings
Footballdatabase club's points 6 February 2022.

Players

First-team squad

Out on loan

Personnel

Technical staff
Source:
{| class="wikitable"
|-
! Position
! Name
|-
|Head coach
|Vacant
|-
|Assistant coach
|Vacant
|-
|Goalkeeping coach
|Vacant
|-
|Fitness coach
|Vacant
|-
|Team manager
|Mohammad Jamal
|-
|Sports therapist
|Ma'mun Harb
|-
|Team doctor
|Moayad Omar
|-

Management
{| class="wikitable"
|-
! Position
! Name
|-
|President
|Bashar Al-Hawamdeh
|-
|Vice-president
|Ghasab Khalil
|-
|rowspan=9|Members 
|-
|Abdelrahman Al-Najar
|-
|Awad Al-Asmar
|-
|Basam Shelbaieh
|-
|Hatem Abu Maelash
|-
|Khaled Abu Quta
|-
|Mokhled Al-Kouz
|-
|Waleed Al-Saoudi
|-
|Ziad Shelbaieh
|-

Managerial history
Last update: 17 November 2022

Kit manufacturers and shirt sponsors

Supporters and rivalries

Fans
Al Wehdat has about 3 million Wehdati fans in Jordan. The fan's most popular chant is "Allah, Wehdat, Al Quds Arabiya" (God, Wehdat, Jerusalem is Arabian).
Al-Wehdat has an ultras named Wehdaty Group (WG) that was founded on 13 September 2012. Their motto is "We support until death".

Derby of Jordan 
Derby of Jordan is a football traditional game between Al-Wehdat and Al-Faisaly. These games receive great interest among the sports community on the Domestic and Arab level due to its intensity and a long history between the two teams. The Derby is as known for its intensity on the pitch as it is for the tensions off the pitch. The two clubs first met on 28 November 1976.

References

External links
National Football Teams 
Kooora 
Soccerway
Official website 
Al-Weehdat

 
Wehdat
Wehdat
Association football clubs established in 1956
Wehdat
1956 establishments in Jordan